Serra San Quirico is a comune (municipality) in the Province of Ancona in the Italian region Marche, located about  southwest of Ancona.

References

External links
 Official website

Cities and towns in the Marche